Janie Tienphosuwan (born 11 September 1981) is an American-born Thai actress and model. She graduated a bachelor in Communication Arts from Bangkok University. After her parents' divorce, she moved back to Thailand with her sibling and mother. She then started her acting career in a music video. After that she quickly rose to fame in a Thai television soap opera with Andrew Gregson.

Filmography

TV dramas

Yot Chiwan (ยอดชีวัน)  with Pip Rawich Terdwong
Thang Phan Kammathep (ทางผ่านกามเทพ) with Andrew Gregson
Nang Chon (นางโจร) with Jay Jetrin Wattanasin
Phrachan San Kon (พระจันทร์แสนกล) with Ken Teeradeth Wongpuapun
Sompong Nong Somchai (สมปองน้องสมชาย) with Paul Pattarapol
Phu Saen Dao (ภูแสนดาว) with Chakrit Yamnam
Lady Yaowarat (เลดี้เยาวราช)  with Aum Atichart
Hoi An  Chan Rak Thur' (ฮอยอัน...ฉันรักเธอ) with Dan Worawech Danuwong D2B
Nueng Nai Suang (หนึ่งในทรวง)  with Ken Teeradeth Wongpuapun
Ruk Khong Nai Dokmai (รักของนายดอกไม้) with Num Sornram Teppitak
Tang Fa Tawan Diao (ต่างฟ้าตะวันเดียว) with Tik Jesdaporn Pholdee
Thep Thida Khon Nok (เทพธิดาขนนก) with Nuttapol
Khun Chai Rai Lem Kwian (คุณชายร้ายเล่มเกวียน) with Film Rattapoom
Rak Ni Hua Chai Rao Chong (รักนี้หัวใจเราจอง) (This Love Belongs to our Hearts) with Ken Theeradej Wongpuapan
Krungthep Ratri (กรุงเทพฯ ราตรี) with Rome Patchata Nampan
Saphai Luk Thung (สะใภ้ลูกทุ่ง) (Country Daughter-In-Law) with Smart Krissada Pornweroj
Yok Lai Mek with Rome Patchata Nampan
Nam Phueng Khom (น้ำผึ้งขม) with Chatchai Plengpanich
Suay Roet Choet Sot with Film Rattapoom
Tart Rak with Smart Krissada Pornweroj
Kol Ruk Luang Jai with Ken Teeradeth Wongpuapun
Lueaed Mung Korn-Hong(Upcoming 2015) with Boy Pakorn
Raeng Ngao (2012) with Phupoom Phongpanu
You Are My Make Up Artist (2022) with Kanawut Traipipattanapong

Master of Ceremony: MCOnline'
 2021 Nola's Family EP 1: Q&A และ พาไป Hua Hin Safari On Air YouTube:Nola's Family

References

Janie Tienphosuwan
Janie Tienphosuwan
Janie Tienphosuwan
Janie Tienphosuwan
1981 births
Living people
Janie Tienphosuwan
Janie Tienphosuwan